Dinah McNabb was a unionist politician in Northern Ireland.

Born in Lurgan, McNabb studied at Queen's University, Belfast.  She was elected to Armagh County Council for the Ulster Unionist Party, and was then elected at the 1945 Northern Ireland general election in North Armagh, serving until her retirement in 1969.

McNabb was a strong supporter of the Lord's Day Observance Society and throughout the 1940s campaigned against greyhound racing on Sundays, particularly in her home town of Lurgan.

McNabb was a bitter opponent of the development of the new town of Craigavon in the area she represented, and was in particular concerned that compensation payments to farmers took no account of their attachment to the land.  In February 1966, she gave a thirty-minute speech attacking the project, which culminated in her resignation from the government.  She lent support to other projects, and led calls for the construction of a bridge or tunnel to connect Northern Ireland with Britain.

McNabb also served as the first Chairman of the 1966 Committee of backbenchers, from its establishment until 1968, and was the President of the Federation of Soroptimists of Great Britain and Ireland.

References

Year of birth missing
Year of death missing
Members of Armagh County Council
Women members of the House of Commons of Northern Ireland
Members of the House of Commons of Northern Ireland 1945–1949
Members of the House of Commons of Northern Ireland 1949–1953
Members of the House of Commons of Northern Ireland 1953–1958
Members of the House of Commons of Northern Ireland 1958–1962
Members of the House of Commons of Northern Ireland 1962–1965
Members of the House of Commons of Northern Ireland 1965–1969
Ulster Unionist Party members of the House of Commons of Northern Ireland
Members of the House of Commons of Northern Ireland for County Armagh constituencies
Ulster Unionist Party councillors
Women councillors in Northern Ireland